Silvia Rampazzo (born 19 January 1980) is an Italian female long-distance runner and mountain runner who won the gold medal at individual senior level at the 2017 World Long Distance Mountain Running Championships.

Biography
She finished 3rd at the 2019 Sierre-Zinal.

National titles
She won four national championships at individual senior level.
Italian Skyrunning Championships
SkyRace: 2016, 2019
SkyMarathon: 2016
UltraMarathon: 2014

References

External links
 

1980 births
Living people
Italian female long-distance runners
Italian female mountain runners
Italian sky runners
Trail runners
World Long Distance Mountain Running Championships winners